The Olympic Conspiracy is a fantasy novel by Katherine Roberts, the fifth novel in The Seven Fabulous Wonders series and the sequel to The Mausoleum Murder.

Plot summary 

The story is about the young Sosi. Sosi has a curse, that makes him half-snake. At each full moon, he is able to "shed his skin" and adopt the look of anyone he wants. When his brother, Theron, is injured, Sosi uses his curse to take his place in the Olympic games so that Theron won't be disqualified. Although his brother Theron is nasty to him, Sosi wants to find out about his curse at Olympia, and redeem himself in his family's eyes.

However, Sosi uncovers a terrorist plot at the Games. Boys competing in the Games, the favourites to win (including Theron), are all being targeted by the mysterious Warriors of Ahriman. Sosi soon discovers that the Warriors are targeting those that are sent dreams by the goddess of victory, Nike, who has manifested herself in the form of a priestess to oversee the Games.

When the priestess reveals herself, it is up to Sosi and his friends to make sure that the ones who she sent victory dreams win their events. However, when three out of the four she picked lose, she becomes extremely weak. The Warrior of Ahriman reveals his plan to sacrifice Nike to arise an army from the dead, Sosi has to embrace his curse. He turns into a snake, and calls Zeus to bring his thunderbolt down on the Warrior, just like his past incarnation, Sosipolis, did 36 years ago.

When the Warrior is defeated, fears arise that Soksi will go to the same fate as Sosipolis and be unable to change back from a snake. However, when Theron admits to everyone how much he loves his little brother (when Sosi's own mother cannot bring herself to) Sosi transforms back into his human self.

Characters 

Sosi, a snake-demon reincarnated as a Macadion. He takes his brother's place in the boy's game looking like Theon. He too is in danger.
Theron, Soksi's brother who can't compete in the boys' games because of a javelin accident. He helps Soksi to turn back into his real form.
Lady Alcmena, Soksi and Theron's mother who whipped Soki for shedding his skin. She is in danger when Soki comes.
Pericles, an opponent in the Games. Also a friend. Doesn't believe Soksi-Theon's story about Soki being a snake-demon and does until the real Theon shows up. Thinks everything that happens is Rasim's fault.
Ereitaia, Pericles' sister also the love interest of Theon. Also friend of priestess Nike
Priestess Nike, like Soksi is a demon-child but can turn into an eagle. She has connections to humans and gets weak if her chosen favorites don't win.
Rasim, a Persian slave who gets blamed for the terrorists. He was with three others when something happened.

2004 British novels
British fantasy novels
Novels by Katherine Roberts
Novels set in ancient Greece
Olympic Games in fiction
HarperCollins books
Olympic Games books